Edward Joseph Thériault (10 May 1901 – 20 December 1968) was a Liberal party member of the Senate of Canada.

He was born in Hartford, Connecticut, the son of Jean Joseph and Marie Agnes (Belliveau) Thériault. He graduated from Dalhousie Law School in 1927. He was a lawyer by trade.

He was appointed to the Senate for the Nova Scotia division on 20 April 1968 following nomination by Prime Minister Pierre Trudeau. Thériault remained a Senator until his death on 20 December 1968.

References

External links
 

1901 births
1968 deaths
American expatriates in Canada
Canadian senators from Nova Scotia
Lawyers in Nova Scotia
Liberal Party of Canada senators
Politicians from Hartford, Connecticut
20th-century Canadian lawyers